Parlad Singh Sawhney (born 15 March 1950) is an Indian politician and 5th term 
member of the Delhi Legislative Assembly belonging to Aam Aadmi Party.

Political career

Parlad Singh Sawhney contested first municipal corporation election in 1977 from Mori Gate ward and lost by 100 votes. In 1983 he won municipal election from same Municipal ward & was made chairman Civil Lines zone from 1983 to 1990 and then repeatedly contested the Chandni Chowk Vidhan Sabha Constituency since 1998 till 2015. In 2015 he lost to Alka Lamba in 2015 Assembly Elections. He was elected for the Second Legislative Assembly of Delhi in 1998, defeating runner-up Viresh Pratap Chaudhary (BJP) by 8,162 votes. In the 2003 state assembly election, he further improved his margin of victory from the last election, winning against runner-up Dharamvir Sharma (BJP) by a margin of 10,866 votes. In the 2008 state assembly election, he defeated runner-up candidate Praveen Khandelwa (BJP) by a margin of 8,019 votes. In 2013 state legislative assembly election, he defeated Suman Kumar Gupta (BJP) by a margin of 8,243 votes.

References

Living people
Members of the Delhi Legislative Assembly
Indian National Congress politicians
Delhi MLAs 2013–2015
Delhi MLAs 2008–2013
1950 births
Aam Aadmi Party politicians